Patricio Enrique Treviño Tripp (born December 28, 1989) is Mexican former footballer who played as a defender. On August 7, 2010, he made his debut with Club América in a game against Tigres UANL.

References

External links

1989 births
Living people
Liga MX players
Club América footballers
Footballers from Mexico City
Mexican footballers
Association football defenders
Universiade bronze medalists for Mexico
Universiade medalists in football